Eric Alfred Winkler (February 13, 1920 – March 18, 1995) was a politician in Ontario, Canada. He was a Progressive Conservative member of the House of Commons of Canada from 1957 to 1967 who represented the riding of Grey—Bruce. He was also a member of provincial parliament from 1967 to 1975 who represented the riding of Grey South. He served as a cabinet minister in the government of Bill Davis.

Background
Born in Hanover, Ontario, he worked in a local furniture factory before joining the RCAF. He served as a  flying officer during World War II, flying missions over Europe when he was shot down in 1942. He survived but was held as a prisoner of war until his release in 1945. When the war ended, he came home and opened Winkler Brothers Menswear. He and his wife Frances raised two sons and two daughters.

Municipal politics
In 1946, he was elected as an alderman for the city of Hanover and was elected mayor in 1948.

Federal politics
He was elected to the House of Commons of Canada in the riding of Grey—Bruce in the 1957 federal election. A Progressive Conservative, he was re-elected in 1958, 1962, 1963, and 1965. From 1963 to 1967, he was the Chief Opposition Whip.

Provincial politics
In 1967, he was elected to the Legislative Assembly of Ontario in the riding of Grey South.  When Bill Davis became Premier in March 1971 he named Winkler as Minister of Revenue to his new cabinet.

He was re-elected during the fall election in 1971. Early in 1972, he was named Minister of Financial and Commercial Affairs. In the fall of 1972 a minor cabinet shuffle saw Winkler moved to Chair of Management Board  where he stayed for the next three years.

In the fall election in 1975 he was defeated for by Liberal candidate Bob McKessock by 298 votes.

Cabinet posts

Later life
He served as a member of the Ontario Racing Commission in the 1980s. He died at home after a long illness. He was 75.

References

Notes

Citations

External links
 
 

1920 births
1995 deaths
Mayors of places in Ontario
Members of the Executive Council of Ontario
Members of the House of Commons of Canada from Ontario
Progressive Conservative Party of Ontario MPPs
Progressive Conservative Party of Canada MPs
Canadian prisoners of war in World War II
Royal Canadian Air Force personnel of World War II
Shot-down aviators
Royal Canadian Air Force officers
World War II prisoners of war held by Germany